Arthur Nory Oyakawa Mariano (born 18 September 1993) is a Brazilian artistic gymnast and a member of the Brazilian national team. He participated in the 2015 World Artistic Gymnastics Championships, placing fourth in the horizontal bar and 12th all-around. He won the bronze medal in floor exercise at the 2016 Summer Olympics in Rio de Janeiro. He is the 2019 World Champion on horizontal bar.

Early life 
Mariano was born in 1993, in Campinas, to a Brazilian father and a Japanese mother. He practiced judo in a club as a child, following his father's footsteps. Mariano changed his mind after watching a gymnastics class.

After his parents' divorce, Mariano moved with his mother to São Paulo, where he entered in a gymnastics team in another club. When he was eleven, Mariano joined Esporte Clube Pinheiros. Mariano won the Brazilian Child Gymnastics Championship when he was fourteen.

Controversy 
In 2015, Mariano and fellow gymnasts Felipe Arakawa and Henrique Flores were suspended from the Brazilian national team for a month, after publishing a Snapchat video in which they made racist jokes addressed at another teammate, Afro-Brazilian gymnast Ângelo Assumpção.

Mariano published another video apologizing for the incident. After his teammate had won the bronze medal at 2016 Olympics, Assumpção said: "I don't keep a grudge on him. We are close friends. I am very proud of Nory. I just hope he behaves like a medal winner outside the arena too."

Modeling career 

Besides being a professional gymnast, Mariano is also an internationally signed model. In 2019, Mariano is the face of Philippine-based international clothing brand BENCH's men's wear campaign in Brazil and Latin America.

Personal life 
On October 28, 2021, Mariano revealed in an Instagram post that he is in a relationship with broadcast media marketing analyst João Otávio Tasso.

References

External links 

 

1993 births
Living people
Brazilian male artistic gymnasts
Sportspeople from Campinas
Gymnasts at the 2015 Pan American Games
Gymnasts at the 2019 Pan American Games
Gymnasts at the 2010 Summer Youth Olympics
Pan American Games gold medalists for Brazil
Pan American Games silver medalists for Brazil
Brazilian people of Japanese descent
Gymnasts at the 2016 Summer Olympics
Olympic gymnasts of Brazil
Olympic bronze medalists for Brazil
Medalists at the 2016 Summer Olympics
Olympic medalists in gymnastics
Pan American Games medalists in gymnastics
South American Games gold medalists for Brazil
South American Games silver medalists for Brazil
South American Games medalists in gymnastics
Competitors at the 2014 South American Games
World champion gymnasts
Medalists at the 2015 Pan American Games
Medalists at the 2019 Pan American Games
Gymnasts at the 2020 Summer Olympics
LGBT gymnasts
Brazilian LGBT sportspeople
Gay sportsmen
20th-century Brazilian people
21st-century Brazilian people